Pedler is an Anglo-Saxon surname. It is a name for someone who worked as a person who worked as the pedder.

Notable persons with the surname
 Alexander Pedler (1849-1918), British civil servant and chemist.
 Ern Pedler (1914-1989), Australian-born American writer.
 John Pedler (1870-1942), Australian politician.
 Kit Pedler (1927-1981), British medical scientist, parapsychologist and science fiction author.
 Margaret Pedler (1877-1948), British novelist.

Surnames of English origin
Surnames of Irish origin